Romain Duris (born 28 May 1974) is a French actor. He is known for his role in Cédric Klapisch's Spanish Apartment trilogy, which consists of L'Auberge Espagnole (2002), Russian Dolls (2005), and Chinese Puzzle (2013). He also appeared in Iris (2016) and All the Money in the World (2017).

Personal life and education
Duris was born in Paris, son of a father who is an engineer-architect and a mother who is a dancer. His father is related to Armand-Gaston Camus and his wife; the French revolutionist was an archivist who founded the Archives nationales. His mother is a descendant of 18th-century Swedish painter Alexander Roslin and his wife. Duris has a sister, pianist Caroline Duris, who played on the soundtrack of the film The Beat That My Heart Skipped (2005), in which he acted.

Duris studied arts at university but first decided to follow a career in music, forming a jazz-funk band. Music remains a major interest. Before going into acting, he started an acid-jazz band in which he was a drummer.

Duris lives in Paris near La Bastille, with his actress girlfriend Olivia Bonamy. They have a son Luigi, born 10 February 2009.

Film career
In 1993 Duris was noticed whilst waiting in a queue by a casting director and was offered a part in the Cédric Klapisch film Le péril jeune (1994). He has since worked regularly with Klapisch.

His first role, however, was in a pop video for Princess Erika, "Faut qu'j'travaille" (I Need To Work), in which he plays the role of a small-time gangster.

Duris is best known for his role as the French exchange student Xavier Rousseau in the Spanish Apartment Trilogy,  L'Auberge Espagnole, The Russian Dolls, and Chinese Puzzle. He has a reputation for versatility, having also played a thug in The Beat That My Heart Skipped (2005).

His roles have ranged from gangsters as in Dobermann through romantic leads as in Heartbreaker to action heroes as in Arsène Lupin.

Filmography

References

External links

"Accidental Heartthrob" Time magazine profile
Romain Duris comprehensive profile
IONCINEMA.com Video Interview with Romain Duris and Pascal Chaumeil for Heartbreaker

1974 births
Living people
French male film actors
Male actors from Paris
Best Actor Lumières Award winners
Most Promising Actor Lumières Award winners
20th-century French male actors
21st-century French male actors
French people of Swedish descent